Hieronyma clusioides is a species of plant in the family Phyllanthaceae, which was recently separated from the Euphorbiaceae. It is endemic to Puerto Rico. It is locally known as cedro macho.

References

clusioides
Endemic flora of Puerto Rico
Data deficient plants
Taxonomy articles created by Polbot
Taxobox binomials not recognized by IUCN